Csaba Szabó (born 1968) is a Hungarian politician, member of the National Assembly (MP) from Nógrád County Regional List from 2010 to 2014.

Szabó has been the mayor of Hollókő since 1998. He was elected a member of the Parliamentary Committee on Culture and Press on May 14, 2010.

References

1968 births
Living people
Mayors of places in Hungary
Fidesz politicians
Members of the National Assembly of Hungary (2010–2014)
People from Balassagyarmat